Lawrence Burst Sperry (21 December 1892, Chicago, Illinois, United States – December 13, 1923, English Channel) was an aviation pioneer who invented the autopilot and the artificial horizon.

Biography
He was the third son of the gyrocompass co-inventor, Elmer Ambrose Sperry, and his wife Zula.   Sperry invented the first autopilot, which he demonstrated with startling success in France in 1914. Sperry is also credited with developing the artificial horizon still used on most aircraft in the early 21st century.

In 1918 he married film actress Winifred Allen, and Flying Magazine reported that they were "the first couple to take an aerial honeymoon" after they flew from Amityville to Governors Island.

On 13 December 1923 Sperry took off amid fog in a Verville-Sperry M-1 Messenger from the United Kingdom headed for France but never reached his destination. His body was found in the English Channel on 11 January 1924.

Legacy
A website using the name Mile High Club regards the "Club's" "founder" as pilot and design engineer Lawrence Sperry, along with "socialite Mrs. Waldo Peirce" (Dorothy Rice Sims)
 citing their flight in an autopilot-equipped Curtiss Flying Boat near New York in November 1916.

Why, Mrs Peirce and I didn't have what you might dignify by calling a real accident. It was only a trivial mishap. We decided to land on the water and came down perfectly from a height of 600 feet and would have made a perfect landing had not the hull of our machine struck one of the stakes that dot the water, which staved a hole in it.

In 1979, Sperry was inducted into the International Air & Space Hall of Fame at the San Diego Air & Space Museum.

Sperry was inducted into the Naval Aviation Hall of Honor at the National Naval Aviation Museum in Pensacola, Florida, in 1992.

Sperry Award winners
The Lawrence Sperry Award is presented by the AIAA for a notable contribution made by a young person, age 35 or under, to the advancement of aeronautics or astronautics.
1936 William C. Rockefeller
1937 Kelly Johnson (engineer)
1938 Russell C. Newhouse
1939 Charles M Kearns Jr.
1941 Ernest G. Stout
1942 Edward C. Wells
1967 Gene Kranz
1970 Glynn Lunney
1984 Sally Ride
1985 William P. Lear
1986 Parviz Moin
1987 James L. Thomas
1988 David W. Thompson
1989 Cas P. Van Dam
1990 Ilan M. Kroo
1991 Mark Drela
1992 John T. Batina
1993 Tim Barth
1994 William K. Anderson
1995 William P Schonberg
1996 Penina Axelrad
1997 John Kallinderis
1998 Iain D. Boyd
1999 Robert D. Braun
2000 Anna-Maria R. McGowan
2001 Keith A Comeaux
2002 Edward C. Smith
2003 Myles L. Baker
2004 Jeffrey D. Jordan
2005 Tim C. Lieuwen
2006 Lynn Nicole Smith
2007 Amy Pritchett
2008 Ryan P. Starkey
2009 Adam Rasheed
2010 Mitchell L. Walker II
2011 M. Brett McMickell
2012 Hamsa Balakrishnan
2013 Eric J. Ruggiero
2014 Kimberley C. Clayfield
2015 Jeremy T. Pinier
2016 Joshua Rovey
2017 Karen T. Berger
2018 Michael D. West
2019 Katya M. Casper
2020 Patrick R. C. Neumann
2021 Benjamin Jorns
2022 Michael P. Snyder

See also

Sperry Corporation

References

External links

Lawrence Sperry Award
, article from Aviation History Magazine.

1892 births
1923 deaths
Aviation inventors
Aviators from Illinois
Aviators killed in aviation accidents or incidents
Engineers from Illinois
People from Chicago
20th-century American engineers
Victims of aviation accidents or incidents in 1923